Sweden competed at the 1964 Summer Olympics in Tokyo, Japan which ran from 11 October 1964 to 24 October 1964. 94 competitors, 76 men and 18 women, took part in 72 events in 13 sports.

Medalists

Athletics

Men's Discus Throw
Lars Haglund
Qualification — no mark (→ did not advance, no ranking)

Canoeing

Cycling

Four cyclists represented Sweden in 1964.

Individual road race
Gösta Pettersson — 4:39:51.74 (→ 7th place)
Erik Pettersson — 4:39:51.74 (→ 11th place) 
Sven Hamrin — 4:39:51.79 (→ 49th place) 
Sture Pettersson — 4:39:51.79 (→ 51st place)

Team time trial
Sven Hamrin
Erik Pettersson
Gösta Pettersson
Sture Pettersson

Diving

Equestrian

Fencing

Seven fencers, five men and two women, represented Sweden in 1964.

Men's épée
 Orvar Lindwall
 Hans Lagerwall
 Göran Abrahamsson

Men's team épée
 Ivar Genesjö, Orvar Lindwall, Hans Lagerwall, Göran Abrahamsson, Carl-Wilhelm Engdahl

Women's foil
 Kerstin Palm
 Christina Wahlberg

Gymnastics

Modern pentathlon

Three male pentathlete represented Sweden in 1964.

Individual
 Bo Jansson
 Rolf Junefelt
 Hans-Gunnar Liljenwall

Team
 Bo Jansson
 Rolf Junefelt
 Hans-Gunnar Liljenwall

Sailing

Shooting

Six shooters represented Sweden in 1964.

25 m pistol
 Stig Berntsson

50 m pistol
 Leif Larsson

300 m rifle, three positions
 John Sundberg
 Jan Poignant

50 m rifle, three positions
 Jan Poignant
 John Sundberg

50 m rifle, prone
 Jan Poignant
 John Sundberg

Trap
 Lennart Ahlin
 Rune Flodman

Swimming

Weightlifting

Wrestling

References

Nations at the 1964 Summer Olympics
1964
1964 in Swedish sport